Athletics competitions have been held at the quadrennial Central American Games that are open for member federations of the Central American Sports Organization (Spanish: Organización Deportiva Centroamericana) ORDECA since the inaugural edition 1973 in Ciudad de Guatemala, Guatemala.  The 1981 games was cancelled due to the unstable political situation in the region. In 2006 the athletics events were not contested by Costa Rica, El Salvador or Panamá.  In 2010, Guatemala did not participate.

Editions

Medals

Gold medal winners for the athletics events of the Central American Games were published.

See also
List of Central American Games records in athletics

External links
Athletics gold medallists from 1973–2006 Central American Games

References

 
Central American Games